33Miles is a contemporary Christian band with country music influences from Franklin, Tennessee.

Background 

The band began playing in Nashville and signed to INO Records, who released the band's debut album, 33Miles, in 2007. The album peaked at No. 8 on Billboards Top Heatseekers albums chart and No. 16 on its Top Christian Albums chart. In 2008, their next album, One Life charted at No. 161 the Billboard 200 and No. 4 on Billboard Top Christian Albums chart. In 2009, they released their Christmas album, Believe. Their 2007 song, "There is a God", was played as the wake-up call music for the Space Shuttle astronauts on their STS-128 mission on September 3, 2009. Pianist Collin Stoddard left the group in 2009 to become a pastor. In 2010, Barton and Lockwood continued on and released Today. In 2014, Lockwood.

Members 

Current
 Jason Barton – lead vocals (formerly of True Vibe)

Former
 Collin Stoddard – piano, backing vocals (2005–2009)
 Chris Lockwood – guitar, backing vocals (2005–2014)

Albums 
33Miles (INO Records, 2007)
One Life (INO Records, 2008) U.S. No. 161
Believe (Christmas release, INO Records, 2009)
Today (INO Records, 2010)
Acoustic Sessions Vol. 1 (EP, self-produced/released, 2011)
Let It Be Glory (Milestone Records, 2013)

Singles

Honors
Nominated for Best New Artist for 2009 Visionary Awards by the Christian Music Hall of Fame
Nominated for New Artist of the Year Dove Award at the 39th GMA Dove Awards.

References

External links

33Miles Artist Profile on ChristianMusicReview.org
Interview with Jason Barton in "Tech Triumphs" by Louisiana Tech University

2005 establishments in Tennessee
Christian rock groups from Tennessee
Musical groups established in 2005
Musical groups from Franklin, Tennessee